Ataenius texanus is a species of aphodiine dung beetle in the family Scarabaeidae. It is found in the Caribbean Sea, Central America, and North America. It is closely related to Ataenius hesperius. which tends to live farther West.

References

Further reading

 

Scarabaeidae
Articles created by Qbugbot
Beetles described in 1874